Matthew Paul Kuhnemann (born 20 September 1996) is an Australian cricketer. He made his List A debut for Cricket Australia XI in the 2017–18 JLT One-Day Cup on 8 October 2017 after being offered a rookie contract for Queensland in the 2016-17 and 2017-18 seasons. He made his international debut for the Australia cricket team in June 2022.

Career
Kuhnemann was born in Brisbane and moved to the Gold Coast in his childhood where he attended The Southport School. He began playing cricket at the age of 10 and made his first grade debut for the Gold Coast Dolphins at 17 years of age. In 2014, he played a pivotal role in the First XI GPS Premiership win for TSS, a victory he still considers the favourite memory of his junior career.

Kuhnemann was named in the Cricket Australia XI squad for the 2017–18 JLT One-Day Cup. He made his List A cricket debut in the 11th match of the tournament against New South Wales. He bowled five overs and took his first List A wicket, getting Kurtis Patterson out stumped. In the second innings he scored 14 runs off 13 balls batting 11th for Cricket Australia before he himself was stumped, ending their run chase 93 runs short.

He made his Twenty20 debut for the Brisbane Heat in the 2018–19 Big Bash League season on 1 February 2019. He made his first-class debut on 17 February 2021, for Queensland in the 2020–21 Sheffield Shield season.

In June 2022, Kuhnemann was added to Australia's One Day International (ODI) squad for their series against Sri Lanka. He made his ODI debut on 16 June 2022, for Australia in Pallekele, taking two  wickets.

Kuhnemann made his Test debut in the second Test against against India in India in February 2023. He was not originally in the squad, with Ashton Agar and Mitchell Swepson being selected ahead of him. But when Swepson returned to Australia for personal reasons, Kuhnemann was added to the squad. Kuhnemann was then selected ahead of Agar for the second Test, and kept his place for the third and fourth Tests.

References

1996 births
Living people
Australian cricketers
Australia One Day International cricketers
Sportspeople from the Gold Coast, Queensland
Cricketers from Queensland
Brisbane Heat cricketers
Cricket Australia XI cricketers
Queensland cricketers
Australia Test cricketers